The Koshien Bowl (甲子園ボウル) is the annual Japanese American college football national championship game, usually played in December at Koshien Stadium.

From the 1949 season until 2008 season, the game was held as the final game of Japan University American Football Championship.  The game is held between 2 universities from East Japan (Hokkaido, Tohoku, Kanto) and West Japan (Tokai, Hokuriku, Kansai, Chushikoku, Kyushu).

Kwansei Gakuin University Fighters is the most successful team with 33 titles (4 shared). Nihon University Phoenix is second with 21 titles (2 shared).

Game results

Winners
In Italics title shared.

See also
College Football Playoff National Championship

References

External links
Official website

American football competitions
American football in Japan
Sports competitions in Japan
College football bowls
American football leagues
College athletics conferences in Japan
1947 establishments in Japan
Recurring sporting events established in 1947